Amos Miller was a 23-year-old African-American man who was lynched from the balcony of the Williamson County Courthouse in Franklin, Tennessee, on August 10, 1888.

Lynching
Miller was accused of raping  Mrs. Scott, a 50-year-old white woman, near Santa Fe in Maury County on June 9 or 10, 1888. Miller worked as a farmhand on the Scott farm in Maury County; the Scotts had a daughter. Miller, who was 23 years old, was described by The Daily American as "a heavy-built, very dark negro".

Miller was arrested on June 16 at the home of Marshal Roberts, where he allegedly tried to steal a hat after he had lost his. Miller reportedly confessed to the assault, and was jailed in Columbia. On the same day, a mob threatened to lynch him. As a result, he was transferred to the jail in Franklin on June 17, but once again, a mob threatened to lynch him. He was transferred to a third location: the Davidson County Jail in Nashville. 

Miller's trial was postponed twice because of these threats. On August 9, one day before the trial, a mob came from Maury County to Franklin. The next morning, some of the mob were in the public square, others on horseback, and others in the courthouse. Miller was taken to Franklin by train and entered the courthouse. His lawyers asked to change the location of the trial or postpone it again, but Judge McAlister rejected this and decided to continue the proceedings. 

During the trial, a mob of 40 men entered the courthouse and, with other men who were already in the building, forced Miller out of the room. The men proceeded to hang Miller from the railings of the courthouse balcony at about 10 am. 

Law enforcement reportedly were unable to identify the lynchers "notwithstanding the fact that not one of the mob was disguised".

See also
False accusations of rape as justification for lynchings

References

1888 deaths
1888 murders in the United States
1888 in Tennessee
August 1888 events
Lynching deaths in Tennessee
African-American history of Tennessee
Franklin, Tennessee